The Milwaukee Road's A2 class comprised 47 compound steam locomotives of the 4-4-2 or 'Atlantic' configuration. The Milwaukee Road acquired them in five batches. 

The first two batches of 9 and 19 locomotives (classes A2 and A2-a) were built by Baldwin Locomotive Works, and were Vauclain compound locomotives with  drivers. The third batch (A2-b) of five locomotive was built by the Milwaukee Road in its Milwaukee, Wisconsin shops with  drivers. The fourth batch (A2-c) of 12 engines was built by Baldwin as Vauclain compounds with  drivers, while the last batch (A2) was for a pair of engines built by Baldwin as balanced compounds. All members of the class were scrapped between 1927–30.

References 

A2
Baldwin locomotives
4-4-2 locomotives
Vauclain compound locomotives
Steam locomotives of the United States
Railway locomotives introduced in 1901
Scrapped locomotives